The Annandale Range Lights are a set of range lights on the east coast of Prince Edward Island, Canada. The range was established in 1898 but is now inactive. The original front range light was relocated in 1990, and was replaced by a new building of a similar design that now operates as a sector light. The lights are white pyramid-shaped structures of different heights, each with a red vertical stripe.

See also
List of lighthouses in Prince Edward Island

References

External links
 Aids to Navigation Canadian Coast Guard

Lighthouses in Prince Edward Island
Lighthouses completed in 1898